The Journey: Tumultuous Times (Chinese: 信约：动荡的年代, also known as Tumultuous Times) is Chinese language period drama which aired on MediaCorp Channel 8. It is the second of The Journey trilogy which chronicles the history of Singapore through the eyes of immigrants during the pre-World War II era until contemporary times. It stars young casts  with Shaun Chen, Jeanette Aw, Andie Chen, Felicia Chin, Romeo Tan and Chen Hanwei as the main cast of the second instalment.  

The Journey will culminate in Singapore's nation building celebrations in 2015 with The Journey: Our Homeland, in time for Singapore's 50th National Day.

Plot
The Journey: Tumultuous Times will depict the period of the Japanese Occupation where the adversity only served to strengthen the characters' survival instinct. When the British colonialists returned, stirrings of dissent became more apparent about their right to rule. In this period of uncertainty, there were vastly different ideals about how independence could be achieved. Yet despite all odds, they pulled through and survived.

This is the story of five young people unraveled over a period of 20 years (1940-1965) spanning World War II and Independence. Major events that will happen in the drama include the Japanese occupation of Singapore, Hock Lee bus riots, student demonstrations, and social tensions.

In the wee hours of the morning on 8 December 1941, Japanese planes attacked Singapore by air under the cloak of the night. This is the beginning of the period of unrest in Singapore. During the Sook Ching, Zhang Tianying gets captured and is killed. Zhang Huiniang dies in her two children's arms after being brutally raped by the Kempeitai.

In 1954, nine years after the Japanese Surrender, Zhang Jia, now with the surname Hu, lives with his adoptive father, Hu Weiren. Zhang Min is living with her cousins, Zhang Yan, Hong Dangyong, Hong Minghui and their parents. Hu Jia has an obvious crush on Bai Lanxiang, also known as Sweet Soup Lass. Hu Jia has become a gang leader and is the heir to Liang Sihai's brand Siu Yee Tong, while another gang, The Seventh Gate of Loyalty sends a mole to join Hu Jia's gang.

The Hock Lee Bus Riots causes a series of other riots like the halting of education during the State of Emergency in Singapore. One of Zhang Min's students are killed in the ensuing protest. Hu Jia then finds out about his parents' horrible deaths, all caused by Weiren. He takes revenge by drowning Weiren to honour his parents.

Zhang Min is then imprisoned by Zhang Yan, who married Minghui. Zhang Yan believes that his brother-in-law is part of an underground gang of fugitives and orders Dangyong to be killed. Minghui overhears this, and files for a divorce. Sweet Soup Lass is then raped and killed after being kidnapped by the mole, Jaws. The Seventh Gate of Loyalty burns the hut where Sweet Soup Lass died. Hu Jia retrieves her body, barely surviving. He then slips into a bout of depression. Minghui tries to console him but to no avail.

Meanwhile, Zhang Yan gets addicted to his power and abuses it, getting drunk and finding a new woman, Fang Lulu. Someone tries to kill Zhang Yan but Minghui takes the bullet for him. She survives.

Dangyong tries to find Minghui at a hospital before being ambushed by Zhang Yan and his group. They run to a bridge before Zhang Yan shoots him, and Dangyong falls into a river. After reaching land, his comrade Ding Hao tries to betray him, but Hu Jia intervenes and takes care of Dangyong. Dangyong realises that his right hand has been crippled.

Zhang Min gets raped by Zhang Yan. She decides to cheapen herself so that Dangyong will survive. Dangyong saves a PTSD-stricken Zhang Min and they get married. Zhang Min then realises her brother is not dead and has been by her side this whole time. Hu Jia and Zhang Min reconcile. Meanwhile, Hu Jia manages to hunt down Jaws and kill him.

Zhang Yan, who tries to kill Dangyong himself accidentally causes the Bukit Ho Swee fire. 2000 families go homeless and Dangyong is blamed to be the arsonist. He goes to jail and studies law there. Then, Zhang Tianpeng (Li Nanxing) realises that Zhang Yan sold his company, Brothers' Balm 2 years ago and dies of a heart attack. Zhang Yan blames Lulu for instigating him to sell his company. Lulu is killed and Zhang Yan goes to jail in England. Hu Jia invites Minghui to dinner but gets stabbed by Bai Gou, the leader of the Seventh Gate of Loyalty. Hu Jia kills him and proposes to Minghui.

It is 1965. Independence arrives and the Zhang and Hong family start a new life...

Cast

Main cast

 Shaun Chen as Hu Jia / Zhang Jia 胡佳 / 张佳
 Younger version portrayed by Damien Teo, Teenage version portrayed by Zong Zijie
 Jeanette Aw as Hong Minghui 洪明慧
 Andie Chen as Hong Dangyong 洪当勇
 Younger version portrayed by Gary Tan
 Felicia Chin as Zhang Min 张敏
 Younger version portrayed by Lieu Yanxi
 Romeo Tan as Steven Chong
 Younger version portrayed by Amos Lim
 Carrie Wong as Bai Lanxiang 白兰香
 Teenage version portrayed by Alicia Lo
 Chen Hanwei as Hu Weiren 胡为人
 Allen Chen 陈祎伦 as Zhang Tianying 张天鹰
 Joanne Peh as Zhang Huiniang 张蕙娘
 Li Nanxing as Zhang Tianpeng 张天鹏
 Chris Tong as Bai Mingzhu 白明珠
 Desmond Tan as Hong Shi 洪石
 Jeanette Aw as Lin Yazi 林鸭子
 Ian Teng 丁翊 as Hong Kuan 洪宽
 Louis Lim 林泳锟 as Uncle Sweet Soup 糖水叔
 Zheng Geping as Liang Sihai 梁四海
 陈翔 as Old Cai 老蔡
 陶樱 as Ling-jie 玲姐
 Ernest Chong 张顺源 as Bullethead 弹子头
 Zakk Lim 林绍凯 as Cannon 大炮
 Alan Yeo 杨添福 as Hei Gou/Black Dog 黑狗
 Brandon Wong as Bai Gou/White Dog 白狗
 小孟 as Boar 山猪
 Seth Ang 翁兴昂 as Jaws/Ironteeth 铁齿
 James Fong 方伟豪 as Ah Wei 阿威
 Eric Lee 李永和 as Chen Anguo 陈安国
 Chia De Zhong 谢德忠 as Pan Zhiming 潘志明
 Jay Goh Jun Hui 吴俊辉 as Li Xiaowen 李小文
 Tan Mei Kee 陈美琪 as Lin Meiyan 林美燕

Others

 陈志强 as Uncle De 德叔
 廖永辉 as Japanese Officer 日军官
 许纾宁 as Yu Jie 玉洁
 郑文 as Luo Xin 罗新
 Ray Nu D/O Su Wan as Siti 西蒂
 叶进华 as Subordinate Lim 林高官
 徐啸天 as Ding Hao 丁浩
 郑扬溢 as Xiao Fang 小方
 陈天赐 as Liu Qiang 刘强
 Nic Lee 李顺利 as Xiao Gao 小高
 刘慧娴 as Fang Lulu 方露露

Production 
The series is partly sponsored by the Media Development Authority of Singapore. Production began in June 2014.

Similar to its predecessor, The Journey: A Voyage, Tumultuous Times uses CGI in its production.

The series is Channel 8's 2014 year-end blockbuster celebrating 51 years of television.

Original soundtrack 
There are three variations of the opening sequence (i.e. images of the theme song). The third opening sequence (episodes 25–30) uses the ending song, 《诀别书》, instead of the original theme song, 《信。约》, unlike the first two opening sequences, used between episodes 1-4 and episodes 5-24 respectively.

Other media 
This series was adapted as a comic and has been selling at Popular Bookstores since November 2015, targeting at upper primary and secondary students. The comic showcases the best of the series, and is promoted by the Committee to Promote Chinese Language.

Accolades 
Tumultuous Times garnered 19 nominations in 16 awards, the most nominations for a drama in Star Awards 2015, and won nine, which include Best Drama Serial. It also garnered two nominations in 10th Seoul International Drama Awards under the Best Drama Series and Best Director categories.

References 

Singapore Chinese dramas
2014 Singaporean television series debuts
2015 Singaporean television series endings
World War II television series
Political drama television series
Historical television series
Hakka culture in Singapore
Channel 8 (Singapore) original programming